Sandıklı District is a district of Afyonkarahisar Province of Turkey. Its seat is the town Sandıklı. Its area is 1,238 km2, and its population is 55,210 (2021).

Composition
There are two municipalities in Sandıklı District:
 Akharım
 Sandıklı

There are 56 villages in Sandıklı District:

 Akın
 Alacami
 Alagöz
 Alamescit
 Arızlar
 Asmacık
 Ballık
 Başağaç
 Başkuyucak
 Baştepe
 Bektaş
 Çambeyli
 Celiloğlu
 Çevrepınar
 Çiğiltepe
 Çomoğlu
 Çukurca
 Daylık
 Dodurga
 Dutağacı
 Ekinhisar
 Emirhisar
 Gökçealan
 Gürsu
 Hırka
 Karacaören
 Karadirek
 Karasandıklı
 Kargın
 Kınık
 Kızık
 Kızılca
 Koçgazi
 Koçhisar
 Kusura
 Kuyucak
 Menteş
 Nasuhoğlu
 Odaköy
 Örenkaya
 Örmekuyu
 Otluk
 Reşadiye
 Saltık
 Selçik
 Şeyhyahşi
 Soğucak
 Sorkun
 Susuz
 Ülfeciler
 Ürküt
 Yanıkören
 Yavaşlar
 Yayman
 Yolkonak
 Yumruca

References

External links
 District governor's official website 

Districts of Afyonkarahisar Province